The women's singles competition at the 2023 FIL World Luge Championships was held on 28 January 2023.

Results
The first run was held at 11:48 and the second run at 13:17.

References

Women's singles